Ilias Manikas (born 11 May 1980 in Greece) is a Greek former professional footballer.

Between 2008 and 2010, he played for Panetolikos.  After his contract expired, he signed with Rodos F.C.

References

Profile at epae.org

1980 births
Living people
Greek footballers
Pierikos F.C. players
Paniliakos F.C. players
Atromitos F.C. players
Levadiakos F.C. players
Apollon Pontou FC players
Thrasyvoulos F.C. players
Panetolikos F.C. players
Rodos F.C. players
Super League Greece players
Association football forwards